Kandaravalli is a village in West Godavari district in the state of Andhra Pradesh in India. The nearest railway station is located at Palacole which is more than 10 Km from Kandaravalli.

Demographics
 India census, Kandaravalli has a population of 1049 of which 556 are males while 493 are females. The average sex ratio of Kandaravalli village is 887. The child population is 111, which makes up 10.58% of the total population of the village, with sex ratio 790. In 2011, the literacy rate of Kandaravalli village was 75.59% when compared to 67.02% of Andhra Pradesh.

See also 
 West Godavari district

References 

Villages in West Godavari district